is a Quaternary stratovolcano. It is located on Hokkaido's Shiretoko Peninsula on the border of Shari in Shari District, Abashiri and Shibetsu in Shibetsu District, Nemuro.

Geology
The mountain is made mainly of andesite and basalt.

See also
 List of volcanoes in Japan
 List of mountains in Japan

References

External links
 

Stratovolcanoes of Japan
Volcanoes of Hokkaido
Mountains of Hokkaido
Pleistocene stratovolcanoes